Songs About Leaving is a 2002 indie rock album by Carissa's Wierd.

Track listing
All songs written by Carissa's Wierd.

Reception

Upon release, the album received favorable reviews. AllMusic reviewed Songs About Leaving as offering up "hauntingly poignant vignettes," stating that its "abundance of down-turned emotional muck may not be everyone's cup of tea, but it definitely stands out as something not quite so ordinary in the musical landscape." Pitchfork gave the album a positive review, stating that it "sounds fascinatingly hesitant", and is "all the more devastating for being the band's final act." 
Sputnikmusic gave the album a positive review describing the album as "a perfect metaphor for depression" and that "it brings you down, it makes time seem slower, it's unsettling, it's isolating, and when you're already knee-deep in it, you wouldn't have it any other way."

References

2002 albums
Carissa's Wierd albums